Boogie is a music video game developed by Electronic Arts for the Wii, PlayStation 2 and Nintendo DS. Being touted as a party-game, it enables players to create their character, then use the Wii Remote and a microphone to sing and dance through it. Each song within the game can be performed either as a karaoke or as a dancing game. The game is based around an alien theme. It was one of the first games released in Brazil for the Wii. Although anticipation was high for the game, it received mixed reviews.

The game was followed by a sequel, Boogie Superstar, in 2008.

Gameplay

The karaoke gameplay is similar to other singing games such as SingStar and Karaoke Revolution. The game comes packaged with a USB microphone. To score, the player must sing in time and in tune with the lyrics as they scroll at the bottom of the screen, with a musical staff to indicate the correct pitch and where the player's current pitch is. Rather than using phonetic detection, the game bases the score on how well the player matches the rhythm and pitch.

The dancing portion uses the Wii Remote and optionally the Nunchuk attachment. As the song plays, the player must move the remote left, right, down or up in time with the beat of the song to earn points. Like EA's SSX games, repeating the same movements will reduce the player's score, so the player must continually string together different orders of movements, as well as changing the dancing style. A "boogie meter" fills with successful dance steps and strings of dance steps. While filled, the player can attempt a special dance move by holding down a button on the remote and then following the exact order of steps (4 to 6 steps long) that comes up. Successful execution of these steps in order and in time with the music will perform that move, while failure will detract some of the boogie meter. The player can move about the dance floor, picking up tokens, score multipliers, and boogie meter boosts when they appear. If the Nunchuk is used, the player will be given special solo sections where they can control the character's facial expression while a phrase of music goes by. Additionally, the user can enter a "Strike a Pose" mode, requiring them to tilt the Nunchunk to have the on-screen character point at an ever-decreasing set of targets for additional points. While the player can also use the basic dancing controls in karaoke mode, these do not affect the score there.

During the story mode, covering five chapters for each of the five characters in the game, the player can only advance after achieving a minimum score on the game. In regular play mode, their score is rated against pre-set scores for performances, and are rewarded with tokens for how good the performance was. Tokens can be used in the in-game store to unlock additional songs, stages, and outfits for character customization.

Players have the ability to create music videos of regular performances, which can include switching camera positions and adding screen effects.

Boogie features competitive and co-operative local multiplayer modes.

It was announced by EA on July 10, 2007, that there are 39 confirmed songs. All songs are covers of the original tracks.

Reception

Despite positive early reviews from the Official Nintendo Magazine and GamePro, who gave it an 81% and a 4 out of 5 respectively, and also from Game Informer, which gave it a 7.75 out of 10, Boogie received divided reviews. 1UP.com gave it a 3 out of 10, saying it was fun for only 20 minutes and criticizing the shallow gameplay. GameSpot likewise gave it a 5.5 out of 10, citing that the karaoke does not work right (e.g., if you make any wrong noise it would give you full points) and that the single player mode was "flat-out lame". IGN gave Boogie a 4.5 out of 10, complaining about oversimplified controls and the whole control system in general. Nevertheless, IGN also stated that they would like to see a sequel with a much more solid gameplay since Boogie had potential. They gave the DS version a 5.5/10, calling it "not much deeper than its console counterpart" and "completely unfulfilling." Nintendo Power gave it a 5.5 out of 10, saying that the game's difficulty was much too easy. They gave the DS version a 7.0, though, saying it was more difficult. PlayStation Official Magazine UK gave the PlayStation 2 version a 5.0/10, concluding with: "In a word – Boo." X-Play gave Boogie a 1 out of 5 because it "lacks a challenge" and that the metronomes from both the Wii Remote and the TV speakers were out of sync, and they didn't know which metronome beat they were supposed to follow.

Boogie currently holds a 59% ranking for the Wii, a 60% for the Nintendo DS, and a 50% for the PS2 on GameRankings; while Metacritic currently gives the game a 57 (Wii), a 58 (DS), and a 52 (PS2) out of 100.

See also

List of Wii games

References

External links
 Official trailer – E3 2007
 GameSpot interview with Alain Tascan, founder of EA Montreal

2007 video games
Dance video games
Electronic Arts games
Karaoke video games
Nintendo DS games
PlayStation 2 games
Video games developed in Canada
Wii games
Multiplayer and single-player video games